The Mysteries of Myra is a 1916 American silent film serial with episodes directed by Leopold and Theodore Wharton and starring Jean Sothern and Howard Estabrook. It was produced in Ithaca, New York by the Whartons and distributed by Pathé Exchange.

Much of the film is lost with three episodes known to be extant.

Cast
Jean Sothern as Myra Maynard
Howard Estabrook as Dr. Payson Alden
Allan Murnane as Arthur Varney
M. W. Rale as Master of the Black Order
Shino Mori as Professor Haji
Bessie Wharton as Mrs. Maynard
Elsie Baker as The Vampire Woman
Leroy Baker as Willis, The Maynards' Butler

unbilled
Aleister Crowley 
F. W. Stewart
Robin H. Townley

Chapter titles
 The Dagger of Dreams
 The Poisoned Flower
 The Mystic Mirrors
 The Wheel of Spirit
 The Fumes of Fear
 The Hypnotic Clue
 The Mystery Mind
 The Nether World
 Invisible Destroyer
 Levitation
 The Fire-Elemental
 Elixir of Youth
 Witchcraft
 Suspended Animation
 The Thought Monster

References

External links

1916 films
American silent serial films
American black-and-white films
Films directed by Leopold Wharton
Films directed by Theodore Wharton
Pathé Exchange films
American mystery films
1916 mystery films
Lost American films
1916 lost films
Lost mystery films
1910s American films
Silent mystery films